Juozas Vilpišauskas (born 1899, date of death unknown) was a Lithuanian cyclist. He competed in the individual time trial event at the 1924 Summer Olympics.

References

External links
 

1899 births
Year of death missing
Lithuanian male cyclists
Olympic cyclists of Lithuania
Cyclists at the 1924 Summer Olympics
Place of birth missing